The Destroyer is an Ibanez brand electric guitar model (originally) manufactured at the FujiGen-Gakki musical instrument factory for the Hoshino-Gakki Company.  The Destroyer model was first introduced by Hoshino-Gakki in 1975 and was based on the Gibson Musical Instruments' Explorer design.  The Destroyer has since undergone several design and line changes and has been available in both 6-string and bass versions.

The star-shape variant was one of the first eccentrically-shaped guitars at the time with a floating tremolo system, making it a popular choice for the heavy metal and shred musicians of the 1980s.

Timeline 

This is a timeline of the first appearance of each verifiable model in an Ibanez catalog.

1976
 Model #2459, Model #2459B
1980
 DT-50, DT-400 (first incarnation)
1982
 DT-300
1983
 DT-100, DT-150, DT-200 (first incarnation), DT-500, DT-600
1984
 DT-250, DT-350, DT-355, DT-450, DT-555, DT-670, DT-870, DB-700
1985
 DT-330, DT-380
1986
 DG-350, DG-351, DG-555,  DT-4550, DT-6750, DB-800
1996
 DT-400 (second incarnation)
2001
 DTX-120
2004
 DT-200 (second incarnation)
2009
 DTT-700

Models appearing in catalogs

6-String models

Bass models

Notable Ibanez Destroyer players 
 Eddie Van Halen (1955–2020) guitarist and founder of the American hard rock band Van Halen, used a Model 2549 Korina Destroyer for the recording of its first album Van Halen, which is also featured (in heavily modified "Shark guitar" form) on the cover of their third album, Women and Children First.
 Adrian Smith (born 1957) guitarist of Iron Maiden played a Japanese version of the DT300 during the Number of the Beast tour in the early '80s and still owns it.
 Paul Stanley played a black DT300 and used it as his primary guitar during the Unmasked Tour in 1980. Before that Ace Frehley played a tan model whilst making the Destroyer album (of no connection in title) in 1976.
 Phil Collen (born 1957) lead guitarist of Def Leppard played a DT555 as his main guitar from 1981 until the end of the Pyromania World Tour in 1984. He still has three more copies of this guitar.
 Dave Mustaine (born 1961) (Megadeth) played a Destroyer in his Metallica years (1981–1983)
 Jay Jay French (born 1952) and Eddie "Fingers" Ojeda of the American heavy metal band Twisted Sister both played modified mid-70's Korina Destroyers.
 Conrad Lant (born 1963) also known by the stage name of Cronos, bass player of Venom played a Destroyer bass guitar.
 Tom Angelripper (born 1963) bassist for Sodom used an Ibanez Destroyer Bass
 Quorthon (1966–2004) Swedish metal musician and founder of black/viking metal band Bathory. He used Destroyer model D-10 guitars on every Bathory album until 1995's album Octagon.
 Kid Congo Powers (born 1961) used a Destroyer in his tenure with The Cramps (1980–1983)

References

External links 
 Ibanez Catalogs - Export
 Ibanez Catalogs - Domestic
 Hoshino-Gakki Parts Web Catalog

Destroyer